Casey John Kotchman (born February 22, 1983) is an American former professional baseball first baseman. He played in Major League Baseball (MLB) for the Anaheim Angels / Los Angeles Angels of Anaheim, Atlanta Braves, Boston Red Sox, Seattle Mariners, Tampa Bay Rays, Cleveland Indians, and Miami Marlins. Kotchman holds the major league record for consecutive error-less games at first base, with 274, set between June 2008 and August 2010.

High school
Kotchman played baseball for Seminole High School in Seminole, Florida. In 2001, Baseball America ranked the team number one nationally, with Kotchman the top-ranked player nationally—the team went undefeated on the field in 31 games (with an official record of 21–10 due to forfeits) and won the state Class 5A championship.

Professional career

Anaheim Angels / Los Angeles Angels of Anaheim
The Anaheim Angels selected Kotchman with the thirteenth overall pick in the 2001 MLB draft.

In , the Angels moved  starter Darin Erstad back to center field, announcing that Kotchman would likely open the season at first base. After struggling in his at-bats early in 2006 because of mononucleosis, Kotchman was placed on the disabled list in early May. In , Kotchman proclaimed himself fully healthy and proved it by winning the Angels' opening day first baseman job for the second straight year.

After a spring in which the Opening Day starting first baseman batted better than .400, he hit just .152 with one home run and six RBI in 29 games with the Angels. Kotchman tried to return to the field, but his rehab assignment was cut short when he experienced dizzy spells in July while playing for Triple-A Salt Lake. He spent much of the rest of the season at home in Florida, performing cardio exercises.

In , he was one of seven Angels regulars to hit over .290 (most in majors) and established career highs in several offensive categories including batting average (.296), home runs (11) and RBI (68). He also hit .320 at Angel Stadium and .274 on the road. He had a 7-game hit streak (7-8/31-8/7), his 4th seven-game streak of season (each matching a career-high). He left the June 16 game against the Los Angeles Dodgers in the 7th after being hit on the helmet by a pickoff throw at second base by Dodgers catcher Russell Martin and was diagnosed with a mild concussion and received three stitches behind his right ear. On June 25, he returned to the starting lineup after missing seven games. He logged the first three triples of his career. He connected for his second career grand slam in the first inning on May 14 against the Texas Rangers. He had a .997 fielding percentage and was ranked fourth among AL first basemen (3 E/1049 TC) in the 2007 season. He hit a solo home run on Opening Night against the Texas Rangers in his first at-bat of the season, his first home run since May 4, 2006, against the Detroit Tigers. He connected for the game-winning RBI single in the 9th inning on July 13 against the Rangers. He collected a career-best four hits in 1 game on August 17 against the Boston Red Sox.

Atlanta Braves

On July 29, Kotchman was traded to the Atlanta Braves along with minor league pitcher Stephen Marek for first baseman Mark Teixeira. Kotchman started his tenure with the Braves by batting just .157 in his first 20 games but he ended the season with a .237 batting average.

Kotchman was placed on the bereavement list after his mother fell ill on August 20, 2008. After seven days, the Braves placed Kotchman on the restricted list so he could continue to be with his mother in Florida. Eleven days from first being placed on the bereavement list, the Braves activated Kotchman.

On January 31, Kotchman avoided arbitration and agreed to a one-year, $2.885 million contract. Kotchman mentioned at spring training in 2009 that playing for the Braves was always a dream of his. Kotchman suffered a shin contusion after being hit by a pitch from Arizona Diamondbacks' pitcher Max Scherzer on May 31 and was expected to be out two to three days. The injury did, however, force Kotchman on the 15-day disabled list and was activated on June 16.

Boston Red Sox
On July 31, 2009, Kotchman was acquired by the Red Sox in a trade for first baseman Adam LaRoche. In Kotchman's first game with the Red Sox, he hit a two-run home run off of Joba Chamberlain. With the Red Sox, Kotchman hit .218 with three doubles, one home run, seven RBIs, and one stolen base in 29 games. This gave Kotchman a combined average of .268 with 23 doubles, seven home runs, 48 RBIs, and 39 walks in 126 games between Boston and Atlanta.

Seattle Mariners
In early January  the Red Sox traded him to the Seattle Mariners for utility player Bill Hall, a minor league player, and cash. On February 3, Kotchman and the Mariners agreed on a new contract, avoiding salary arbitration.

On June 3, 2010, Kotchman set the Major League Baseball individual streak record with 2,003 consecutive chances without an error. The previous record had been held by Kevin Youkilis of the Boston Red Sox, established between July 4, 2006, and June 6, 2008. On August 21, 2010, the streak ended when Kotchman mishandled a hard groundball hit by Curtis Granderson of the New York Yankees. The error was his first since July 20, 2008, when he played for the Los Angeles Angels of Anaheim, a streak of 2,379 fielding chances.

He batted .217 for the season.  On November 4, 2010, Kotchman refused an outright assignment to AAA by the Mariners, electing to become a free agent instead.

Tampa Bay Rays

Kotchman signed a minor league contract with an invitation to 2011 spring training with the Tampa Bay Rays. On March 26 the Rays assigned Kotchman to Durham.  Following the retirement of Manny Ramirez six games into the 2011 season, Kotchman's contract was selected from Durham and he was added to the Rays' active roster. On August 9, 2011, Kotchman hit a walk-off home run off Kansas City Royals reliever Blake Wood to give the Rays a 2-1 win. Through 2019, he had the best career fielding percentage among major league first basemen (.998), ahead of Kevin Youkilis.

Cleveland Indians
Kotchman signed a one-year contract with the Cleveland Indians on February 3, 2012.

Miami Marlins
On February 15, 2013 he signed a minor league contract with the Miami Marlins. He was released on August 26, 2013.

Kansas City Royals
After sitting all of the 2014 season retired from baseball, Kotchman signed a minor league deal with the Royals on March 6, 2015.

Toronto Blue Jays
On November 23, 2015, Kotchman signed a minor league contract with the Toronto Blue Jays that included an invitation to spring training. He became a free agent on November 7, 2016.

Personal life
He is the son of Tom Kotchman, longtime Angels' minor league manager and scout.  His mother, Sue Kotchman, works as a principal and was formerly a teacher. She suffered a brain hemorrhage during the 2008 season; as a result Kotchman had to be placed on the Major League bereavement list, and later the restricted list. She recovered, however.  His sister Christal Kotchman is a former College of Charleston softball team member.

References

External links

1983 births
Living people
Anaheim Angels players
Arkansas Travelers players
Arizona League Angels players
Atlanta Braves players
Baseball players at the 2015 Pan American Games
Baseball players from St. Petersburg, Florida
Boston Red Sox players
Buffalo Bisons (minor league) players
Cedar Rapids Kernels players
Cleveland Indians players
Durham Bulls players
Gwinnett Braves players
Jupiter Hammerheads players
Los Angeles Angels players
Major League Baseball first basemen
Miami Marlins players
Omaha Storm Chasers players
Pan American Games medalists in baseball
Pan American Games silver medalists for the United States
Provo Angels players
Rancho Cucamonga Quakes players
Salt Lake Bees players
Salt Lake Stingers players
Seattle Mariners players
Seminole High School (Pinellas County, Florida) alumni
Tampa Bay Rays players
United States national baseball team players
Medalists at the 2015 Pan American Games